Coenotropa is a genus of snout moths. It was described by George Hampson in 1918 and contains the species Coenotropa limitella. It is found in Paraguay.

References

Anerastiini
Monotypic moth genera
Moths of South America
Pyralidae genera